Youssef Anwer (born 25 August 1936) is an Iraqi boxer. He competed in the men's featherweight event at the 1964 Summer Olympics. At the 1964 Summer Olympics, he lost to José Antonio Duran of Mexico in the Round of 32.

References

External links
 

1936 births
Living people
Iraqi male boxers
Olympic boxers of Iraq
Boxers at the 1964 Summer Olympics
Place of birth missing (living people)
Featherweight boxers